Tuscaloosa County High School serves grades 9–12 and is located in Northport, Alabama, America, forming part of the Tuscaloosa County Schools.

History
The original Tuscaloosa County High was opened near downtown Northport in 1926. In 2000, it was moved to its current location, seven miles north of downtown.

Athletics
Tuscaloosa County High competes in the Alabama High School Athletic Association, under class 7A region 3. The school's athletic squads are nicknamed the Wildcats. The football team won the 6A State Championship in 1997.

Notable alumni
 Curley Hallman, College Football coach
 Hannah Brown, television personality, model, and Miss Alabama USA
 Frank Lary, MLB baseball player (Detroit Tigers, Milwaukee Braves, New York Mets, Chicago White Sox)
 Lillie Leatherwood, Olympic gold medalist
 Le'Ron McClain, NFL football player
 Gregory F. Rayburn, CEO of Hostess Brands
 Lurleen Wallace, Alabama governor
 Bo Scarbrough, NFL runningback

See also
 Tuscaloosa County High School (historical) for 1926–1999

References

External links
School website

Educational institutions established in 1926
Public high schools in Alabama
Schools in Tuscaloosa County, Alabama
1926 establishments in Alabama